Gynodiastylidae is one of the eight most commonly recognised families of crustaceans of the order Cumacea. They are especially prevalent in the southern hemisphere, with some types described from Japan, Thailand and the Persian Gulf. Most are found at less than  depth.

Anatomy
Gynodiastylidae have a small free telson, usually lacking terminal setae, though in some cases there may be two. The interior branch (endopod) of the uropods is present  on segments one through three. The number of free thoracic somites is never reduced. The first pereopods have a group of long rigid fibres (setae) on the propodus. Males have no pleopods. The flagellum of the second antenna does not reach further than the hindmost edge of the carapace. Females have a very small second antenna (much smaller than the first). They also have no exopods (outer branches) on their third maxillipeds. Because they lack exceptions to the two most important diagnostic characteristics (the lack of pleopods in males and of exopods on maxilliped 3 in females), Gynodiastylidae have a pre-eminent place among monographic descriptions.

References

External links

Cumacea
Taxa named by Thomas Roscoe Rede Stebbing
Crustacean families